Chinetti is a surname. Notable people with the surname include:

 Alfredo Chinetti (born 1949), Italian cyclist
 Luigi Chinetti (1901–1994), Italian-born racing driver

Italian-language surnames